Marino Miranda Salgado (born 28 February 1962) is a Mexican politician affiliated with the PRD. He served as a federal deputy of the LXII Legislature of the Mexican Congress representing Guerrero. He previously served as a local deputy in the Congress of Guerrero, as well as the municipal president of Teloloapan.

References

1962 births
Living people
Politicians from Guerrero
Party of the Democratic Revolution politicians
21st-century Mexican politicians
Deputies of the LXII Legislature of Mexico
Members of the Chamber of Deputies (Mexico) for Guerrero
Members of the Congress of Guerrero
Municipal presidents in Guerrero